Mestský Basketbalový Klub Komárno, also known as Rieker Komárno for sponsorship reasons, is a Slovak professional basketball team based in Komárno. The team currently plays in the Slovak Extraliga.

History
In 2012, Rieker made its first Extraliga Finals appearance, but lost 3–1 to Prievidza. In 2013, Rieker lost 4–3 to Inter Bratislava in the Finals. In the 2014–15 season, the franchise got its first national title after beating Prievidza 4–3 in the Finals.

Trophies
Slovak Extraliga
Champions (1): 2014–15
Slovak Cup
Winners (1): 2012–13
Alpe Adria Cup:
Winners (1): 2016–17

Season by season

References

Basketball teams established in 1991
Basketball teams in Slovakia
1991 establishments in Czechoslovakia
Komárno
Sport in Nitra Region